The Burnaugh Building, at 107 N. River St. in Enterprise, Oregon, was built during 1916–17 in Early Commercial style.  It was commissioned by S. L. Burnaugh for renting;  Burnaugh served as mayor of Enterprise in the year following its construction.  It has served as a post office, a meeting hall, as a businessplace, and as a multiple dwelling.  It was listed on the National Register of Historic Places in 1993.

It is one of six buildings in Enterprise that was built of "Bowlby stone", a local tuffaceous rock;  the Wallowa County Courthouse and the Record-Chieftain's plant building are the only other two surviving of the six.

See also
National Register of Historic Places listings in Wallowa County, Oregon

References 

National Register of Historic Places in Wallowa County, Oregon
Buildings designated early commercial in the National Register of Historic Places
Buildings and structures in Enterprise, Oregon

Commercial buildings completed in 1917